Hans Streuli (1924 – 18 February 2018) was a Swiss middle-distance runner. He competed in the men's 800 metres at the 1948 Summer Olympics.

References

External links
 

1924 births
2018 deaths
Athletes (track and field) at the 1948 Summer Olympics
Swiss male middle-distance runners
Olympic athletes of Switzerland
Place of birth missing